The Pitman School District is a comprehensive community public school district that serves students in pre-kindergarten through twelfth grade from Pitman, in Gloucester County, New Jersey, United States.

As of the 2021–22 school year, the district, comprised of five schools, had an enrollment of 1,134 students and 118.8 classroom teachers (on an FTE basis), for a student–teacher ratio of 9.5:1.

The district is classified by the New Jersey Department of Education as being in District Factor Group "FG", the fourth-highest of eight groupings. District Factor Groups organize districts statewide to allow comparison by common socioeconomic characteristics of the local districts. From lowest socioeconomic status to highest, the categories are A, B, CD, DE, FG, GH, I and J.

Schools 
Schools in the district (with 2021–22 enrollment data from the National Center for Education Statistics) are:
Elementary schools
Elwood Kindle Elementary School with 174 students in grades K-5
Karolyn Mason, Principal
Memorial Elementary School with 196 students in grades PreK-5
Kiersten Sager Miller, Principal
W. C. K. Walls Elementary School with 174 students in grades PreK-5
Chris Morris, Principal
Pitman Middle School with 256 students in grades 6-8
Kristen Stewart, Principal
High school
Pitman High School with 324 students in grades 9-12
Dr. Cherie Lombardo, Principal

Administration
Core members of the district's administration are:
Steven Crispin, Interim Superintendent
Carisa Rose, Business Administrator / Board Secretary

Board of education
The district's board of education, comprised of seven members, sets policy and oversees the fiscal and educational operation of the district through its administration. As a Type II school district, the board's trustees are elected directly by voters to serve three-year terms of office on a staggered basis, with either two or three seats up for election each year held (since 2012) as part of the November general election. The board appoints a superintendent to oversee the district's day-to-day operations and a business administrator to supervise the business functions of the district.

References

External links 
Pitman School District
 
School Data for the Pitman School District, National Center for Education Statistics

Pitman, New Jersey
New Jersey District Factor Group FG
School districts in Gloucester County, New Jersey